Blankensee is a municipality in the Vorpommern-Greifswald district, in Mecklenburg-Vorpommern, Germany. It is located on the border with Poland.

References

Vorpommern-Greifswald
Germany–Poland border crossings